Kowloon Shangri-La is a five-star hotel of the Hong Kong-based Shangri-La Hotels and Resorts group. It is located on Mody Road in Tsim Sha Tsui East overlooking Victoria Harbour and the Hong Kong Island skyline. It is the sister hotel to the Island Shangri-La in Admiralty district, Hong Kong.

History 
The history of the hotel is tied to the history of the Shangri-La Hotels and Resorts chain, which began with the opening of the Shangri-La Hotel in Singapore, in 1971. The Kuok Group, which built the Singapore hotel, put it under the management of Western International Hotels. Kuok entered the hotel management world in 1979 when Kuok Hotels was formed to manage the Rasa Sayang Resort and Spa in Penang, the Golden Sands Resort in Penang, and The Fijian, Yanuca Island, on Fiji.

A management contract with Western International for the new Hong Kong property was signed on 1 August 1978 and the Shangri-La Hotel opened on 17 June 1981, managed by Westin Hotels, the new name of Western International as of 5 January 1981. In 1983, the Kuok Group created Shangri-La International Hotel Management Ltd. The hotel was soon after renamed the Kowloon Shangri-La.

In April 1991,Shangri-La Hotels and Resorts assumed management of the Kowloon Shangri-La from Westin.

To celebrate its 30th anniversary in 2011, the hotel held an exhibition of photographs submitted by the public, from guests who had visited from around the world during the three decades since its opening. A judging panel of photographer Water Poon, president of the Institute of Professional Photographers Carsten Schael, and Anthony Lau Chun-hon, executive director of the Tourism Board selected the winners.

Awards 
Kowloon Shangri-La frequently receives recognition as one of the top luxury hotels in Asia, featuring in media such Condé Nast Traveler. It has won the following awards:

 Certificate of Excellence, Daodao.com (Trip Advisor China), 2013
 World's Top Hotel Gold List, Condé Nast Traveler (USA), 1997 to 2013
 Best Hotels for Service (Asia) Category, Condé Nast Traveler Readers' Awards (UK), 2011
 China's Top 10 Most Popular Business Hotels, The Golden Pillow Award of China Hotels, 2009 and 2011
 Top 10 MICE Hotels in China, China Hotel Starlight Awards, 2011 and 2012
 Top 10 Best Business Hotels in China, Travel + Leisure (China), 2010 and 2011
 Guide to the World's Best Hotels T+L 500 (Ranked 6th among hotels in Hong Kong for in 2011), Travel & Leisure (USA), 2003 to 2011
 Top 25 Luxury Hotels in China, Tripadvisor (UK)'s Travellers' Choice, 2012
 One of the Top 25 Hotels in Hong Kong / Macau / Taiwan, TripAdvisor (UK)'s Travellers' Choice, 2010

Design and construction 

Kowloon Shangri-La is located in the tourist-heavy Tsim Sha Tsui East, within walking distance of the luxury boutiques on Canton Road, the Temple Street Night Market and Chungking Mansions.

The interior design, which includes a lobby created from Italian Statuario marble and two murals of the Shangri-La Valley by UK artist Malcolm Golding, was developed by Y Shibata & Associates of Japan, Don Aston Designers Asia Ltd., and Bilkey Llinas Design Ltd. Attention to detail includes the changing of carpets in the elevators at midnight every night, to mark the days of the week.

Malcolm Golding returned in 2003, 23 years after painting the original murals, to restore them. He became a tourist attraction as he used bamboo scaffolding to repaint his vision of Shangri-La as a "lush tropical valley hemmed by startling mountains, with colourful birds and huge flowering plants surrounding a stylised Chinese palace."

Features

Rooms and suites
The rooms of the hotel were developed by LRF Designers Limited and number 679, of which 638 are guest rooms, and 41 are Suites. Suites include the Executive, Harbour View, Premier Harbour View, Specialty and Presidential Suite. The rooms average 450 square feet, some of the largest available on the crowded peninsula of Kowloon and many of the rooms directly overlook Hong Kong Island waterfront. Rooms on floors 19 through 21 are dedicated to the "Horizon Club"

Restaurants 

The hotel holds five specialty restaurants serving a variety of cuisines under Executive Chef, as well as a lounge and a bar, Lobby Lounge and a Tapas Bar. Both outlets were designed by Bilkey Llinas Design Ltd., and the Tapes Bar was honoured with the "Wine by The Glass Restaurant Award", organised by Restaurant & Bar Hong Kong, in 2011.

Previously, the hotel hosted the Californian restaurant Napa, described as a "Hong Kong institution" when it closed in June 2005 after 12 years. It was the first fusion restaurant of its kind to appear in a Hong Kong Hotel and was led by chef David Monson. The hotel's French bistro Margaux closed down the same year, replaced by Italian restaurant Angelini.

 Angelini – Italian

Chef Alessandro Angelini leads the hotel's Italian restaurant, which was honoured as "One of Hong Kong's 50 Finest Restaurants" in Dining with Stars 2008, organised by Hong Kong Tatler and supported by Hong Kong Tourism Board. The restaurant was designed by Zanghellini & Holt Architect and has 69 seats. 

 Cafe Kool – International
Led by Chef Lou Kuok Kam, Cafe Kool is the hotel's largest, with 322 seats. Serving Global cuisine, it was designed by Bilkey Llinas Design Ltd. It has a hardwoodwood ceiling and marble surfaces. The restaurant offers a buffet.

 Nadaman – Japanese
Serving Kyoto-style Japanese cuisine in kaiseki style and also including a teppanyaki grill and sushi bar, Nadaman is led by Chef Takao Kojima and can host 138 guests. Nadaman first opened in Osaka in 1830, and the Kowloon Shangri-La restaurant which opened at the same time as the hotel, in 1981, was its first overseas outlet. Kojima spent 20 years at Nadaman in Japan before moving to Hong Kong, where here changes the mini-kaiseki menu every month.

The restaurant's interior was designed by CL3 Architects Ltd. and Kanko Kikaku Sekkeisha Consultants & Designers Ltd., Tokyo. In 2005 it was named one of the "top ten great hotel restaurants in the world" by Hotels Magazine. In 2010, the Kaiseki cuisine Japanese fine dining restaurant, Nadaman, was listed along with its sister outlet at the Island Shangri-La, as the 'Best Japanese restaurant' on the Hong Kong Best Eats 2010 list compiled by CNN Tra in 2010.

 Shang Palace – Chinese
Shang Palace, led by Chef Cheung Long Yin is a one-Michelin-starred Cantonese restaurant, received in the Michelin Guide's 2020 Hong Kong and Macau edition. Designed by LRF Designers Ltd., it holds 160. The restaurant was entirely refurbished and reopened in September 2012.

 Deli Kool – Delicatessen
Chef Jonathan Gallet created bread, pastries and desserts at the 24-seater delicatessen located at the hotel's mezzanine.

Corporate social responsibility

Kowloon Shangri-La, Hong Kong has worked with a number of local charitable organisations such as Christian Action, offering financial assistance to guest donation programs, as well as arranging numerous charity visits to those in need, and sponsoring venues for charity events. Projects include a School visit and Easter egg-painting workshop for students from Ebenezer School & Home for The Visually Impaired, a Tree-Planting Challenge organised by Friends of the Earth, a Mid-Autumn Festival Lunch Party for elderly in collaboration with The Rotary Club of Channel Islands, and food donation and serving to refugees and asylum seekers at Chung King Mansion in association with Foodlink.

See also
 Shangri-La Hotels and Resorts
 List of buildings and structures in Hong Kong

References

External links

 Kowloon Shangri-La official website

Hotels in Hong Kong
Hotels established in 1981
Hotel buildings completed in 1981
Tsim Sha Tsui East
Shangri-La Hotels and Resorts
1981 establishments in Hong Kong